Lend Me Your Wife is a 1935 British comedy film directed by W. P. Kellino and starring Henry Kendall, Kathleen Kelly and Cyril Smith. It was made at Elstree Studios as a quota quickie.

Cast
 Henry Kendall as Tony Radford  
 Kathleen Kelly as Grace Harwood  
 Cyril Smith as Charles Harwood  
 Jimmy Godden as Uncle Jerry  
 Marie Ault as Aunt Jane  
 Hal Gordon as Nick Larkin  
 Gillian Maude as Ruth 
 Hilda Campbell-Russell as Martha Larkin

References

Bibliography
 Chibnall, Steve. Quota Quickies: The Birth of the British 'B' Film. British Film Institute, 2007.
 Low, Rachael. Filmmaking in 1930s Britain. George Allen & Unwin, 1985.
 Wood, Linda. British Films, 1927-1939. British Film Institute, 1986.

External links
 

1935 films
British comedy films
1935 comedy films
1930s English-language films
Films directed by W. P. Kellino
Quota quickies
Films shot at British International Pictures Studios
Films set in England
British black-and-white films
1930s British films